The Tennents' Sixes was an annual indoor football tournament contested each January by senior football clubs from Scotland (along with some English guests) between 1984 and 1993. The tournament was sponsored by Tennent Caledonian Breweries and organised by the Scottish Football Association. When Tennent Caledonian Breweries withdrew their sponsorship after the 1993 event, the Sixes was discontinued.

The format used was dependent on the number of teams participating: in most cases 10 teams were involved and would be drawn into 2 groups of 5 who would play each other once. From there, the first and second-placed teams from each group would contest the knockout stages, consisting of two semi-finals and a final.

History

The teams involved were usually from the Scottish Football League Premier Division, but occasionally guest participants from the lower divisions of the Scottish Football League were invited along with English clubs Nottingham Forest and Manchester City.

The inaugural tournament was contested at Coasters Arena in Falkirk in 1984. The following year it took place at Ingliston Showground near Edinburgh, and all subsequent tournaments were played at the Scottish Exhibition and Conference Centre in Glasgow.

No individual team dominated the event over its history with Aberdeen, Heart of Midlothian and Rangers all winning the tournament twice each. Motherwell were beaten finalists on 3 occasions.

The final team to win the Tennents Sixes was Partick Thistle; to this day they still have the trophy displayed in the Firhill trophy cabinet.

Rules

The rules of play evolved as the years progressed, and the following summary refers to the rules used  during the final competition in 1993. Many were similar to indoor soccer in America, which in turn was developed with many influences, such as the use of a penalty box and making the pitch the same size as a NHL rink, from ice hockey.

Goals were set into the walls.
Squads consisted of up to 12 players, with no more than 6 on the field. Substitutions were unlimited and could be made at any time.
Matches were played in 2 halves of 7 minutes 30 seconds during the first round and 2 halves of 10 minutes during the knockout stages. At the end of all tied matches, even during the group phase, a penalty shoot-out would be held. A win on penalties in the group phase was worth 2 points as opposed to the 3 gained by winning after regulation time. 
Two yellow lines separated the field into thirds. Players had to be inside this line to shoot on goal, and a three line pass rule (similar to ice hockey's two line pass rule) was in effect.
The goal area at each end was reserved for the sole use of the goalkeeper defending it. If an outfield player from the same team deliberately infringed on it a penalty kick would be awarded to the opposing team.
Goalkeepers could only hold on to the ball for six seconds. This was a particularly interesting situation as FIFA would later adopt this rule for conventional association football.
Teams were required to maintain a presence of at least 2 players in the opponents' half (1 player prior to 1991) or a penalty kick would be awarded to the opposing team.
Players shown the yellow card would be dispatched to the Sin Bin for 2 minutes. Aside from the normal offences, players could receive a yellow card for the Sixes-specific offence of deliberately kicking the ball over the perimeter wall to waste time.

Winners

1984: Rangers (defeated Dundee 6–4 in final)
1985: Heart of Midlothian (defeated Morton 4–1 in final)
1986: Aberdeen (defeated St Mirren 3–0 in final)
1987: Aberdeen (defeated Heart of Midlothian 4–3 in final)
1988: Dundee (defeated Motherwell 3–2 in final)
1989:  Rangers (defeated Motherwell 2–1 in final)
1990:  Hibernian (defeated St Mirren 3–0 in final)
1991:  Heart of Midlothian (defeated Motherwell 5–3 in final)
1992: Celtic (defeated St Johnstone 4–2 in the final)
1993:  Partick Thistle (defeated Airdrieonians 4–3 in the final)

See also

Masters football

References

External links
Tennent’s Sixes 1993: Video highlights, part one at STV
Tennent's Sixes 1993: Video highlights, part two at STV

Indoor soccer competitions
Defunct football cup competitions in Scotland
Recurring sporting events established in 1984
Recurring events disestablished in 1993
1984 establishments in Scotland
1993 disestablishments in Scotland
Tennents' Sixes